GSN may refer to:
 Game Show Network, an American television channel
 Gay Star News, a British news website
 Gelsolin
 Gigabyte System Network, a computer networking technology
 Global SchoolNet, an American educational organization
 Global Seismographic Network
 Goal Structuring Notation, a graphical argument notation used in safety cases
 Nema language
 Saipan International Airport, in the Northern Mariana Islands
 Yashica Electro 35 GSN, a camera